Léopold Bissol (born Le Robert, October 8, 1889 in Martinique, and died September 18, 1982 in Fort-de-France) was a politician from Martinique who served in the French National Assembly from 1945–1958.

References 
Léopold Bissol page on the French National Assembly website

1889 births
1982 deaths
People from Le Robert
Martinican Communist Party politicians
Members of the Constituent Assembly of France (1945)
Members of the Constituent Assembly of France (1946)
Deputies of the 1st National Assembly of the French Fourth Republic
Deputies of the 2nd National Assembly of the French Fourth Republic
Deputies of the 3rd National Assembly of the French Fourth Republic